Unkindness of ravens can refer to:

 The collective noun for a group of ravens
 An Unkindness of Ravens, 1985 novel by Ruth Rendell
 The Unkindness of Ravens, 2016 British horror film 
 The Unkindness of Ravens, 2021 novel by M. E. Hilliard